Dry Cleaning Ray is a mini-album released by British Art rock band No-Man. It was intended to be a companion release to Wild Opera album, compiling reinterpretations and original songs stemming from the Wild Opera sessions.

In keeping with other No-Man releases, several tracks offer other uses of Steven Wilson's previously released music; in this case, "Jack the Sax" reuses the guitar progression from "Wake as Gun" (on the Porcupine Tree release Insignificance), while "Sweetside Silver Night" uses a chord progression later reused for ".3" from Porcupine Tree's In Absentia.

Track listing

Musicians
Tim Bowness – vocals, words
Steven Wilson – instruments
Natalie Box – violins (4)
Bryn Jones (Muslimgauze) – remix / reconstruction (6)

References

External links
No-Man's Official Website
No-Man's Fan Site

No-Man albums
1997 EPs